The Little Minister is a lost 1922 American silent drama film directed by David Smith and produced and distributed by Vitagraph Company of America. It is based on an 1891 novel and 1897 play by J. M. Barrie, The Little Minister. The film was released almost in direct competition with a late 1921 version from Paramount, The Little Minister starring Betty Compson. This version stars Vitagraph favorites Alice Calhoun and James Morrison.

Cast 
 Alice Calhoun as Lady Babbie
 James Morrison as Gavin Dishart
 Henry Herbert as Lord Rintoul
Alberta Lee as Margaret Dishart
 William McCall as Rob Dow
 Dorothea Wolbert as Nanny Webster
Maud Emery as Jean (credited as Maud Emery)
 George Stanley as Doctor McQueen
 Mickey Daniels as Micah Dow (credited as Richard Daniels)
 Charles Wheelock as Captain Halliwell

References

External links 
 
 
 

1922 films
American silent feature films
Films based on British novels
Films based on works by J. M. Barrie
Lost American films
Vitagraph Studios films
1922 drama films
Silent American drama films
Films directed by David Smith (director)
American black-and-white films
Films set in Scotland
1922 lost films
Lost drama films
1920s American films